Essex is a village in Kankakee County, Illinois, United States. The population was 802 at the 2010 census, up from 554 at the 2000 census. It is included in the Kankakee-Bradley, Illinois Metropolitan Statistical Area.

History
Ira M. Lish (1855–1937), Illinois politician and lawyer, was born in Essex.

Unlike earlier underground coal mines exploited by coal miners living in the now lost, nearby settlements of Tracy, Oklahoma and Clarke City, open-pit mines were established near Essex.

Geography
Essex is located in western Kankakee County at  (41.177620, -88.191338).

Demographics

As of the 2000 United States Census, there were 554 people, 199 households, and 160 families residing in the village. The racial makeup of the village was 98.38% White, and 1.62% from two or more races.

There were 199 households, out of which 36.7% had children under the age of 18 living with them, 68.3% were married couples living together, 6.0% had a female householder with no husband present, and 19.1% were non-families. 16.1% of all households were made up of individuals, and 9.0% had someone living alone who was 65 years of age or older. The average household size was 2.78 and the average family size was 3.10.

In the village 25.3% were under the age of 18, 11.2% were from 18 to 24, 25.5% were from 25 to 44, 26.2% were from 45 to 64, and 11.9% were 65 years of age or older. The median age was 37 years. For every 100 females, there were 109.8 males. For every 100 females age 18 and over, there were 106.0 males.

The median income for a household in the village was $50,238, and the median income for a family was $51,118. Males had a median income of $40,577 versus $24,531 for females. The per capita income for the village was $18,686. About 5.5% of families and 5.8% of the population were below the poverty line, including 2.0% of those under age 18 and none of those age 65 or over.

References

External links
Official website

Villages in Kankakee County, Illinois
Villages in Illinois